Lilibeth is a given name. It is often a nickname for the given name Elizabeth. It can also be a combination of the names Lily and Beth. Usage of the name increased after Prince Harry, Duke of Sussex and Meghan, Duchess of Sussex gave their daughter the similar name Lilibet in 2021. There were 13 American girls called Lilibeth in 2020 and 46 American girls given the name in 2021.  
People with the given name or nickname include:
 Lilibeth Chacón (born 1992), Venezuelan racing cyclist
 Lilibeth Morillo (born 1969), Venezuelan singer-songwriter, actress, and television host
 Lilibeth Cuenca Rasmussen (born 1970), Danish video and performance artist

References

See also
 Lilibet, a similar name or nickname